William Alexis Stone (April 18, 1846March 1, 1920) was an American politician who served as the 22nd governor of Pennsylvania, serving from 1899 to 1903.

Early life and family

Stone was born in Wellsboro, Pennsylvania. He was descended from Simon Stone, Jr (1631 - 1708), who was born in Bocking, Essex, England, and settled in the Massachusetts Bay Colony. In 1864, Stone enlisted in the Union Army as a private during the American Civil War, and became a second lieutenant in 1865. He continued his military service after the war in the Pennsylvania National Guard. He attended Mansfield State Normal School and taught while studying law.

The eldest daughter by his first wife married Dr. Percy D. Hickling, a prominent physician in Washington D.C. Dr. Hickling was on the Committee of President Cleveland's Inaugural Ball. They were both members of the Shakespeare Club of Washington of which Dr. Hickling was also President.

Col. William A. Stone's second wife, Elizabeth B. White, was the youngest daughter of Judge R.C. White, of Wellsboro, Ohio. She was connected with one of the oldest and best of Pennsylvania's families. Benjamin Franklin's daughter married into the Bach family, of which her mother was descended, and her mother was a cousin of Dr. William Carpenter and Dr. Mary Carpenter, of London, who, with the Princess Alice, established a Mission School in India. Elizabeth White Stone was born in Tioga County. She attended school in New York City, where she was graduated at a musical academy. They had 4 children, 3 daughters and 1 son.

Appointments
In 1872, he was appointed as a clerk for the Pennsylvania State House of Representatives. Two years later, he ran for his first political office, becoming district attorney of Tioga County. In 1876, he was appointed district attorney for the U.S. District Court for the Western District of Pennsylvania by President Rutherford B. Hayes. He held that post until 1886 when he violated President Chester A. Arthur's edict for political office-holders not to campaign for political candidates. Stone campaigned for James A. Beaver, and his removal only increased his popularity.

Congress and Pennsylvania Governorship
Stone served four terms in the United States House of Representatives before running for governor in 1898. During his term in office, Pennsylvania's state debt was eliminated, and a new capitol building was commissioned. After serving as governor, Stone joined his son in private law practice in Pittsburgh, Pennsylvania. He also served briefly as prothonotary for the Pennsylvania Supreme Court in 1915.

In Memoriam
Stone Hall, a residence hall on Penn State's University Park campus is named for Stone.

References

The Political Graveyard

External links

1846 births
1920 deaths
People from Wellsboro, Pennsylvania
American people of English descent
Republican Party members of the United States House of Representatives from Pennsylvania
Republican Party governors of Pennsylvania
Union Army officers
United States Attorneys for the Western District of Pennsylvania
People of Pennsylvania in the American Civil War
Politicians from Pittsburgh
Mansfield University of Pennsylvania alumni